This is a list of public holidays in Monaco.

Public holidays

Other public holidays
At times, other public holidays are declared for certain occasions. The birth of Prince Albert II's twins, Princess Gabriella and Jacques, Hereditary Prince of Monaco, has been celebrated in a similar fashion to National Day and 7 January 2015 was declared a public holiday.

 Prince Rainier Day - 19 November

External links 
 Public holidays, Monaco Government website

 
Monegasque culture
Monaco
Monaco-related lists